The Cessna 441 Conquest II is the first turboprop powered aircraft designed by Cessna, and was meant to fill the gap between their jets and piston-engined aircraft. It was developed in November 1974, with the first aircraft delivered in September 1977. It is a pressurized, 8–9 passenger turbine development of the Cessna 404 Titan.

Development

The original design from 1972 for this aircraft was known as the Model 435, and was to be powered by Continental GTSIO-520X engines with three-bladed propellers. By 1975, the designed evolved into the turboprop-powered Model 441. It was certified by the FAA on August 19, 1977. Cessna renamed the Model 441 the Conquest II in 1983.
1984 models starting with constructor number 195 used lighter weight four-bladed McCauley propellers. A 441 with Pratt & Whitney Canada PT6A-112 turboprops was flown in 1986, but did not enter production.
A smaller aircraft was marketed as the Cessna 425 Conquest I, itself a turbine development of the Cessna 421.

In September 2007, Cessna limited the Conquest II to 22,500 hours of air time for US for air carriers, an advise only for private operators.
Cessna built 362 units from 1977 through 1986.

Design

Most have been upgraded from twin Garrett TPE331-8s engines to -10s for better climb performance, a ceiling raised to FL350 from FL330, and TBO raised from 3,000 to 5,000h for $225,000 per engine.

Converting from the standard three-blade propellers to smaller diameter Hartzell four-blade propellers results in a climb rate improved by 200 fpm (1.01 m/s) and a  increase in cruise speed as well as reducing cabin noise and improving ground clearance.
The aircraft has a retractable tricycle landing gear and has a ground roll of 1,785 ft (544 m) on takeoff. The high aspect ratio wings use bonded construction techniques.
The ICAO designator for the Cessna Conquest as used in flight plans is C441.

Operational history 

By May 2019, 290 aircraft remained in service, at a $.75-.9M value down from $1-1.9M in 2011.

The King Air B200 has a roomier cabin but  less range, a slower cruise and higher fuel burn.
The Mitsubishi MU-2B-60 has a similar fuel burn and speed but flies lower.
The Piper Cheyenne III is fast but has poorer fuel efficiency and  less range.
The Piper Cheyenne 400 is  faster but burns fuel like a light jet.

The Conquest II is operated by corporate owners, air charter operators and previously by the Royal Flying Doctor Service in Australia. Examples of the type have been exported to many countries including Austria, Australia, Canada, Ecuador, Finland, Germany, Iceland, Mexico, Norway, Peru, South Africa, Sweden and the United Kingdom.

Specifications (Conquest II)

See also

References

External links

 Airliners.net - Photographs
 Airliners.net - Cessna Conquest

441
1970s United States civil utility aircraft
Low-wing aircraft
Aircraft first flown in 1975
Twin-turboprop tractor aircraft